The Good Fortune Unicorn is a sculpture by Anibal Riebeling, installed along Puerto Vallarta's Malecón, in the Mexican state of Jalisco. According to Fodor's, "Its sleek and curvy shape makes it look like a natural part of the malecón."

References

External links

 

Centro, Puerto Vallarta
Outdoor sculptures in Puerto Vallarta
Statues in Jalisco
Works about unicorns